Niko Snoj (born 13 July 1990) is a football midfielder from Slovenia. He plays for Radomlje.

References

External links

1990 births
Living people
Slovenian footballers
Association football midfielders
NK Triglav Kranj players